Skye and Lochalsh is one of eight former local government districts of the two-tier Highland region of Scotland. The main offices of the Skye and Lochalsh district council were in Portree, on the Isle of Skye.

History
As statutory local government areas, the region and districts were created in 1975, under the Local Government (Scotland) Act 1973, and abolished in 1996, under the Local Government etc (Scotland) Act 1994. The area of the region is now the Highland unitary council area, and the former Skye and Lochalsh district is within the Highland Council's Ross, Skye and Lochaber corporate management area.

The 1973 legislation abolished local government counties and burghs throughout Scotland and created a new system of nine two-tier regions and three islands council areas. Each region consisted of a number of districts and the islands areas were created as unitary council areas. The Skye and Lochash district of the Highland region was created by merging the Skye district of Inverness-shire (consisting of the Skye group of Inner Hebridean islands) with the South West district of Ross and Cromarty (consisting of an area around and including the village of Kyle of Lochalsh).

The 1994 legislation abolished regions and districts and established a system of 32 unitary council areas covering the whole of Scotland, and all of the Highland districts were merged into the new unitary Highland council area.

In 1996 the new Highland Council adopted the areas of the former districts as council management areas, and created area committees to represent them. The Skye and Lochalsh management area then consisted of six out of the 72 wards of the council area, each electing one councillor by the first past the post system of election. In 1999 ward boundaries were redrawn to create 80 new wards. Management area boundaries were not redrawn, however, and therefore area committees ceased to represent exactly the areas for which they were named and made decisions. The Skye and Lochalsh committee continued to have six members.

Ward boundaries were redrawn again in 2007, and the council's eight management areas were abolished in favour of three new corporate management areas, including the Ross, Skye and Lochaber area which absorbed the former Skye and Lochalsh area. The Highland council area now has 22 wards and each elects three or four councillors by the single transferable vote system, a system designed to produce a form of proportional representation. The total number of councillors remains the same. The Ross, Skye and Lochaber area consists of six out of the 22 wards and these ward elect 23 of the 80 Highland councillors.

There is also a Ross, Skye and Lochaber constituency of the House of Commons of the Parliament of the United Kingdom (at Westminster), but its boundaries are not exactly those of the council corporated management area. The constituency was created in 2005 with boundaries based on those of wards in use during the period 1999 to 2007.

The Skye group of islands is now a ward named as the Eilean a' Cheò ward, which elects four councillors. The Lochalsh area is now within the Wester Ross, Strathpeffer and Lochalsh ward, which also elects four councillors.

District coat of arms 
The Skye and Lochalsh District Council coat of arms, granted by Lord Lyon King of Arms in 1987, featured a wavy blue fess across the centre of the shield for the Kyle of Lochalsh. Above this were emblems for the three main historic families of the Isle of Skye (Macleod of Macleod, Macdonald of Sleat and Mackinnon) and below it a stag's head from the arms of Mackenzie of Kintail for the Lochalsh area. The gold coronet above the arms was a special pattern reserved for the arms of Scottish district councils, and was topped by thistle-heads.

See also
Politics of the Highland council area
Subdivisions of Scotland

References

External links
 Skye and Lochalsh Visitor Guide

 
Districts of Scotland